Neena Cheema is an Indian veteran actress. After a long career in stage plays and Punjabi television, she shifted to Mumbai in 1998 and since has performed in a number of TV serials and Hindi and Punjabi films.

Films
 Mann (1999) - Uncredited

Television

Other works

Telefilms 
Chacha Maarenge, Hindi
Chuniya, Hindi, 1990
Aagosh, Hindi, 1987  
Thes, Hindi, 1985
Sailab, Hindi, 1985

Teleplays 
Gas Regulator, Hindi
Ladayi, Hindi, 1993  
Wapasi, Hindi, 1983

Stage plays 
Rangnagri, Hindi

External links 
 https://www.imdb.com/name/nm1569768/
 http://www.tvbasti.com/tvshow/Sabki-Laadli-Bebo/275
 http://www.tvbasti.com/tvshow/Parrivaar--Kartavya-ki-pariksha/217
 https://www.imdb.com/title/tt0390705/

Indian television actresses
Living people
Indian film actresses
Year of birth missing (living people)
Indian stage actresses
Actresses in Punjabi cinema
Actresses in Hindi television